Wewela Hall, in Wewela, South Dakota, was built in 1926.  It was listed on the National Register of Historic Places in 2010.

It was built by the community in 1926.

It has also been known as the Wewela Community Club Hall.

References

External links

Community centres		
National Register of Historic Places in Tripp County, South Dakota

Cultural infrastructure completed in 1926